Lakhta is the name of several rural localities in Russia.

Lakhta, Severodvinsk, Arkhangelsk Oblast, a village under the administrative jurisdiction of Severodvinsk in Arkhangelsk Oblast
Lakhta, Katuninsky Selsoviet, Primorsky District, Arkhangelsk Oblast, a village in Katuninsky Selsoviet of Primorsky District in Arkhangelsk Oblast
Lakhta, Lastolsky Selsoviet, Primorsky District, Arkhangelsk Oblast, a village in Lastolsky Selsoviet of Primorsky District in Arkhangelsk Oblast
Lakhta (Essoylskoye Rural Settlement), Pryazhinsky District, Republic of Karelia, a village in Pryazhinsky District of the Republic of Karelia; municipally, a part of Essoylskoye Rural Settlement of that district
Lakhta (Vedlozerskoye Rural Settlement), Pryazhinsky District, Republic of Karelia, a village in Pryazhinsky District of the Republic of Karelia; municipally, a part of Vedlozerskoye Rural Settlement of that district
Lakhta, Boksitogorsky District, Leningrad Oblast, a village in Radogoshchinskoye Settlement Municipal Formation of Boksitogorsky District in Leningrad Oblast
Lakhta, Volkhovsky District, Leningrad Oblast, a village in Potaninskoye Settlement Municipal Formation of Volkhovsky District in Leningrad Oblast

See also
Lakhta, Saint Petersburg, a historical area of Saint Petersburg, Russia